Mast Magan is a romantic Hindi song from the 2014 Bollywood film, 2 States. Composed by Shankar–Ehsaan–Loy, the song is sung by Arijit Singh and Chinmayi, with lyrics penned by Amitabh Bhattacharya. The music video of the track features actors Arjun Kapoor and Alia Bhatt.

Background 
The song is composed by Shankar–Ehsaan–Loy. Director of the film, Abhishek Varman wanted Shankar–Ehsaan–Loy to compose the music for the album, in order to create a romantic album that has soul and 'young energy' in it. Producer of the film, Sajid Nadiadwala selected the song as his most favorite track from the album. In an interview with Bollywood Hungama, the leading lady of the film Alia Bhatt stated that the song is one of her personal favorites from the film.

The song is sung by Arijit Singh and Chinmayi. Nadiawala and Karan Johar felt that Singh's voice has a 'haunting quality' and makes the song stay with the listener. The song's lyrics were penned by Amitabh Bhattacharya. Johar stated that Bhattacharya is a strong talent in music and his words tend to have a 'colloquial nature', but they also have a 'tremendous amount of soul'.

Music video 
The song is picturised on Arjun Kapoor and Alia Bhatt. The video of the song shows how the bond between their respective characters, Punjabi Krish Malhotra and Tamilian Ananya Swaminathan strengthens. It has been filmed at locations in Tamil Nadu including a temple at Mylapore and a pier at Ennore beach. The video of the song was filmed much before the recording of the actual song.

Release 
The song was released on 15 March 2014, along with other tracks in the album. The music video of the song was officially released on 26 March 2014, through the YouTube channel of T-Series. The music video of the song, was the third song released from the album, after two the two singles, "Offo" and "Locha-E-Ulfat"

The song was ranked at the third position in the "Bollywood music report January–September 2014" published by The Times of India.

Critical reception 
The song received positive reviews from critics.

Bollywood Hungama's Rajiv Vijayakar credited, 'imagery-laden' lyrics by Amitabh Bhattacharya, the 'haunting rhythmic guitar riff' and the 'placidity of the composition' along with Arijit Singh's vocals, for making the song, the finest number from the soundtrack.

Joginder Tuteja from Rediff.com praised the rendition of the song by the vocalists, and stated the song has a slight "Sufi touch though it is inherently a Bollywood number". Devesh Sharma reviewing from Filmfare mentioned the 'soulful rendition' by the singers and felt, they did 'magic' in the song as well. Bodrul Chaudhury reviewing from Bolly Spice, praised the lyrics of the song and stated that immense singing by Singh gave 'the standout performance' in the song.

Sankhayan Ghosh from The Indian Express found the chorus of the song 'wonderful' though criticized for having an 'uncanny resemblance with Ishq Sufiyana' from The Dirty Picture (2011). Aishwarya from Koimoi stated the song "does not bore you or even sound repetitive" and felt, Singh's vocals resembles of Shafqat Amanat Ali in the song.

Accolades

References

External links 

Hindi songs
Hindi film songs
Arijit Singh songs
Songs written for films
2014 songs
Songs with music by Shankar–Ehsaan–Loy